The T-7 was China's first sounding rocket. A test rocket, dubbed the T-7M, was first successfully launched on 19 February 1960 in Nanhui, Shanghai, and a full-scale rocket was launched on 13 September 1960. Wang Xiji of the Shanghai Institute of Mechanical and Electrical Engineering was the chief designer. Twenty-four T-7 rockets were launched between 1960 and 1965, and it was retired after a final launch in 1969.

Specifications

History
In 1958, China started its satellite program and tasked the Shanghai Institute of Mechanical and Electrical Engineering with the development of rockets for satellite launches.

The institute had very few experienced scientists. Other than Wang and Yang, there were only two visiting professors, Bian Yingui and Li Minhua. The rest of the institute consisted of a few hundred university students with an average age of 21. Even Wang and Yang had little knowledge about rockets and had to learn on the fly.

The development team worked with severe shortages of technical experience, funds, and equipment. They often worked in hunger as China was in the midst of the Great Famine. They performed calculations using hand-cranked mechanical computers as the team did not have an electronic computer, and a single ballistics calculation could take more than forty days. People at the launch bunker communicated with the tracking sites by relayed shouting or hand signals, and the rocket's liquid fuel tank was pressurised using a bicycle pump.

After a failed first launch in January 1960, the second launch on 19 February 1960 was successful. This success, achieved by a group of young engineers without the help of Soviet experts, impressed Mao Zedong.

In March 1960, a launch site was built in Guangde County, Anhui for the full-scale T-7, which was successfully launched on 13 September 1960.

24 T-7 rockets were launched in total from 1960 to 1965, including nine carrying meteorological payloads. The rocket was retired after a final launch in 1969.

Aftermath
The experience gained from developing the T-7 contributed greatly to the development of the Long March 1, the rocket that launched China's first satellite. After their success with T-7, Wang Xiji and his team were transferred to Beijing and Wang was appointed the chief designer of the Long March 1. He again collaborated with Yang Nansheng, and the Long March 1 successfully launched the Dong Fang Hong I satellite in 1970.

References

Sounding rockets of China
1960 establishments in China
20th century in Shanghai
Pudong